Serena and Venus Williams defeated Chanda Rubin and Sandrine Testud in the final, 4–6, 6–1, 6–4 to win the women's doubles tennis title at the 1999 US Open. It was the second doubles major title for the Williams sisters, and their second step towards completing the career Golden Slam in doubles.

Martina Hingis and Jana Novotná were the defending champions, but Hingis did not compete this year. Novotná teamed up with Natasha Zvereva, but they lost in the third round to Liezel Horn and Kimberly Po.

Seeds

Qualifying draw

Draw

Finals

Top half

Section 1

Section 2

Bottom half

Section 3

Section 4

External links
1999 US Open – Women's draws and results at the International Tennis Federation

Women's Doubles
US Open (tennis) by year – Women's doubles
1999 in women's tennis
1999 in American women's sports